Soo Line 2719 is a 4-6-2 "Pacific" type steam locomotive built by the American Locomotive Company (ALCO) for use on passenger trains operated by the Minneapolis, St. Paul and Sault Ste. Marie Railway ("Soo Line"). No. 2719 was used to haul the Soo Line's last steam-powered train, a June 21, 1959 round-trip excursion between Minneapolis, Minnesota and Ladysmith, Wisconsin. It was then displayed in Eau Claire, Wisconsin until 1996. It was restored and operated in excursion service from 1998 until 2013 when its boiler certificate expired. Today, the locomotive remains on static display in Duluth, Minnesota.

History

Revenue service 
No. 2719 was built by the American Locomotive Company (ALCO) in May, 1923 in Schenectady, New York. It was one of 6 H-23 class 4-6-2 “Pacific” type steam locomotives built for the Minneapolis, St. Paul and Sault Ste. Marie Railroad, better known as the Soo Line Railroad. At some point in the mid-1940s, the locomotive became one of a few H-23 locomotives to be equipped with an experimental Worthington feedwater heater on the pilot deck, and it was ultimately deemed a failure. The locomotive operated until the mid-1950s when it was overhauled and put into storage. It was brought out of storage to haul the very last steam trains on Soo Line's trackage in 1959. It is estimated that No. 2719 traveled more than 3 million miles during its time on the Soo Line. The locomotive was officially retired from service on June 21, 1959 and was subsequently donated to the City of Eau Claire, Wisconsin in 1960, were it was placed on static display in Carson Park for the next thirty-seven years.

Excursion service 

On May 23, 1996, a fundraising dinner, entitled "An Evening in the Club Car", was held at the Holiday Inn Convention Center in Eau Claire to benefit a potential restoration effort on No. 2719. The locomotive was removed from Carson Park, and restoration work was undertaken by the Locomotive and Tower Preservation Fund, Ltd. After a highly aggressive restoration schedule went on, work was completed and the engine made its first test run on July 27, 1998, the engine's first inaugural excursion run took place on September 19, 1998, running a "triple-headed excursion" with Northern Pacific class S-10 4-6-0 No. 328 and Soo Line class L-1 2-8-2 No. 1003. There was no museum to house No. 2719, and excursion runs occurred over different tracks owned by different railroads, including the Wisconsin and Southern Railroad.

In June 2000, 2719 was moved to the Wisconsin Great Northern Railroad in Spooner.  It operated during the summer months in Spooner, until the Wisconsin Central was bought out by the Canadian National Railway in 2001. The locomotive returned to the roundhouse in Altoona, Wisconsin for the winter.

With the last excursion run in 2003 and with the Altoona, Wisconsin roundhouse being demolished on June 1, 2004, No. 2719 was facing a bleak future. In 2005, discussions were held to move the locomotive to the Lake Superior Railroad Museum (LSRM) in Duluth, Minnesota, which operates the North Shore Scenic Railroad (NSSR). With assistance from the L&TPF, Ltd., the museum moved No. 2719 to the LSRM on December 17, 2006. After going through some extensive repairs during the summer of 2007, the locomotive was test fired again on August 24, 2007, and it made a successful round trip test run from Duluth to Two Harbors, Minnesota the following day. No. 2719 became the first steam locomotive to operate on the NSSR since Duluth and Northern Minnesota 2-8-2 No. 14 last operated there on October 3, 1998. No. 2719 pulled regular excursions from 2007 to 2013. In May 2013, it met Milwaukee Road 4-8-4 No. 261 for the first time, and it pulled special excursion trains for that weekend’s National Train Day.

No. 2719's boiler flue time was to expire on July 31, 2013, but its flue time was extended so that it could operate into late summer of 2013. It pulled its final excursion on September 14, 2013. Afterwards, the locomotive was to have gotten its FRA-required 1,472-day rebuild. However, because of ownership disputes, it was drained to the LSRM for display instead. In June 2015, No. 2719 was officially purchased by the LSRM. In the summer of 2019, No. 2719 was displayed outside for the first time (not under the parking ramp) along with No. 14 and D&NE 28 to welcome Union Pacific Big Boy No. 4014 during its midwest tour stop in Duluth.

Disposition 

After deciding to restore Duluth & Northeastern 28 back to operating condition, the museum abandoned plans to restore No. 2719 back to operation. This sparked the L&TPF to seek other options for No. 2719. On February 21, 2015, the Locomotive & Tower Preservation Fund approached the City of Eau Claire and offered to sell 2719 back to the city for $1, with the city also covering the cost of the $135,000 shelter to house the locomotive. It came at great surprise to the LSRM, as they were unaware of the talk to move the engine back to permanent outdoor display. The L&TPF weren't interested in renewing the lease with the LSRM, which was to expire in 2015.

The LSRM was originally seeking $305,000 in 2011 to restore it back to operation after its flue time expired in 2013. However, after No. 2719's last run, the museum announced it was restoring a different steam locomotive (that the museum owned) to operate in time for the 2016 operating season, postponing hopes of bringing No. 2719 back under steam.

The city of Eau Claire attempted to raise funds to return the locomotive, but its attempts were highly unsuccessful. The L&TPF announced that if the city didn't want the locomotive back, it would look for offers elsewhere.

On February 24, 2015, the city decided it wanted up to two months to make its decision on No. 2719. It was likely that the city would buy No. 2719 for $1, then sell it back to the LSRM for $2, as the city council seemed to agree they'd rather have No. 2719 be restored to operation in the future than sitting on permanent static display.

The city, however, wanted this time extension to explore all options available. Representatives from the LSRM were present at the meeting and promised if No. 2719 stayed in Duluth, it could possibly run again.

On May 11, 2015, the city of Eau Claire held a community meeting to debate what the city's intentions for the locomotive would be. Some community members argued the locomotive should be returned to its home in Eau Claire, while others suggested that the LSRM would make a better home for No. 2719.

The city council discussed No. 2719's fate on May 12. The council could not reach a majority, and another debate was planned for June. The council wanted the first right of refusal should No. 2719 be sold by the LSRM at some point in the future.

On Tuesday, June 9, 2015, the city of Eau Claire, the Locomotive & Tower Preservation Fund, and the LSRM agreed to an immediate sale of the locomotive from the city to the LSRM. The city of Eau Claire was given repurchase rights of the locomotive for 3 years if the city decides they want the locomotive back. The LSRM, as part of the deal, would pay for and design signage for the city where the locomotive was once displayed.

Eau Claire's "buy-back agreement" lasted three years for the city to find any way to restore and return the locomotive to the city. 

In June 2018, the city of Eau Claire voted for an extension to 2019 for the right to repurchase the locomotive and return it to Eau Claire, the city then purchased the locomotive back from Duluth for $4 in August, and explored options to return the locomotive to Eau Claire from Duluth.

However, in April 2019, the City of Eau Claire decided to open leasing and/or purchasing options for the locomotive after realizing the substantial cost to relocate and protect the locomotive. The LSRM in Duluth and city council members began new negotiations to keep the locomotive in Duluth and to alternate operating cycles with D&NE 28.

On October 22, 2019, the Eau Claire City Council voted to sell the locomotive back to the LSRM for $8, with the hope that the museum will return it back to service.

Accidents and incidents 
 On May 9, 1999, No. 2719 was being stored after finishing a series of excursions, when the fireman's side got struck by a Wisconsin Central freight consist led by SD45 No. 6623, damaging a number of components, including the air compressor, boiler, and running gear. The locomotive was subsequently repaired and brought back to service.

Other H-23 class locomotives 
There were six H-23 class locomotives built in May 1923.  2719 and 2718 are preserved.
 2718 - On display at the National Railroad Museum in Green Bay, Wisconsin
 2720 - Scrapped at United States Steel, July 19, 1951 
 2721 - Scrapped at Purdy Company, November 13, 1950 
 2722 - Scrapped at American Iron & Supply, December 28, 1954 
 2723 - Scrapped at Purdy Company, November 13, 1950

References

External links 

 Lake Superior Railroad Museum  2719's current owners.
 North Shore Scenic Railroad  Where the 2719 operated 2007 - 2013.

2719
ALCO locomotives
4-6-2 locomotives
Individual locomotives of the United States
Rail transportation on the National Register of Historic Places in Minnesota
Railway locomotives on the National Register of Historic Places
Railway locomotives introduced in 1923
National Register of Historic Places in St. Louis County, Minnesota
Standard gauge locomotives of the United States
Preserved steam locomotives of Minnesota